Hecho En España, also known as Hecho en Madrid (English: Made in Spain and also known as Made in Madrid) is the third officially released live album by Mexican pop group RBD, released on October 1, 2007 in Mexico and on October 2, 2007 in Spain. The CD was recorded in Madrid, Spain on June 22, 2007.  The album was recorded during RBD's concert in Madrid as part of their Tour Celestial 2007 in Spain. The show was held at the famous Spanish Vicente Calderón Stadium in front of almost 40,000 people enjoying the group's music. A live video of the entire concert was also recorded and released on DVD also on October 2, 2007. The CD itself was released in a series of special edition packs: One included gloves and a lighter and a CD/DVD bundle, while another pack included gloves and an umbrella as well as the CD and DVD. The CD/DVD packs went on pre-sale on September 27, 2007 in Mexico, slated for their October 1 release. In February 2008, 4 months after the DVD release in Brazil, the CD was released in a special limited edition, celebrating the sales of over 50,000 DVDs in the country.

Background and release
The live album was recorded at the Vicente Calderón Stadium in the city of Madrid, Spain, from a concert that formed part of RBD's Tour Celestial 2007 world tour. The concert setlist mainly consisted of songs from the group's third and fourth studio albums, Celestial and Rebels.

The album was released on October 1, 2007 in Mexico and on October 2, 2007 in Spain. In Brazil, only the accompanying live concert DVD of the same name was released. The official album release was held on October 3, 2007 to coincide with the group's 'Worldwide RBD Day' celebration, which gathered 5,000 fans in an autograph signing that lasted four hours. RBD band member Anahí stated regarding the album's release in Mexico: "The truth is this is surprising, we're very excited and thankful to know that our Mexican fans follow us every step of the way just like the first day and that the 'Rebeldemania' instead of decreasing continues to grow and we couldn't be happier."

Track listing 

Notes
"Money Money" samples RBD's own song "Lento" (2006). Both were produced by reggaeton production duo Luny Tunes.
"Bésame Sin Miedo" is the Spanish language cover version of the song "Kiss Me Like You Mean It", by American singer and actress Sara Paxton.
"Tu Amor" was originally recorded by American singer Jon B. on his album Cool Relax (1997).
The album did not include some songs that RBD performed during the actual live concert, such as the medley from their first studio album, Rebelde (2004), as well as "Fuera" and "Me Voy", from their second studio album, Nuestro Amor (2005). There are unofficial versions of the album including such songs, but in low quality and edited by fans. One of the songs is "Tal Vez Mañana" by Maite Perroni.

Personnel 
Credits adapted from the album's liner notes. 

Recording location
 Vicente Calderón Stadium (Madrid, Spain)

Mastering location
 The Mastering Lab (Ojai, California)

Performance credits
RBD – main artist

Musicians

Güido Laris – bass, musical director
Mauricio Soto "Bicho" – drums
Charly Rey – guitar

Gonzalo Velázquez – guitar
Eduardo Tellez – keyboards, piano
Luis Carrillo "Catire" – percussion

Production

Camilo Lara – A&R
Fernando Grediaga – A&R
Diego Torán – A&R
Angélica Pérez Allende – A&R coordination
Güido Laris – arrangements, director, editing, mixing, post-production
Rubén Ramírez – assistant
Roberto Carlos Sánchez – assistant
Luis Luisillo M. – associate producer
Sangwook "Sunny" Nam – DVD audio mastering, DVD video mastering
Doug Sax – DVD video mastering
Pablo Chávez – editing, mixing, post-production
Pedro Damián – executive producer
hulahula.com.mx – graphic design
Televisa En Vivo – management
Juanlu Vela – photography
Carolina Palomo – production coordinator
Fernando Díaz – recording
Pablo Medrano –  recording
Fernando Fernández "Camachete" – recording assistant

Charts and certifications

Charts

Certifications

Release history

See also
Hecho En España (DVD)

Notes

2007 live albums
RBD live albums